The Beach 98th Street station (signed as Beach 98th Street–Playland station) is a station on the IND Rockaway Line of the New York City Subway. It is served by the Rockaway Park Shuttle at all times and ten daily rush-hour only A trains.


History
The station was originally built by the Long Island Rail Road in April 1903 as Steeplechase on the Rockaway Beach Branch, and was also a trolley stop of the Ocean Electric Railway. It was renamed Playland on May 15, 1933, for the former Rockaways' Playland, which was closed in 1985. No trace of the park remains other than the station name. In 1942, the station was replaced with an elevated station, and was taken out of service on October 3, 1955 as part of its purchase by the New York City Transit Authority, which reopened it as a subway station on June 28, 1956.

Station layout

The station is built on a concrete viaduct. There are two tracks and two side platforms. New lights have been installed. Canopies, mezzanine, and side walls are similar to Beach 90th Street.

Exits
There is a crossunder to the tiled mezzanine. The southbound platform is longer than the northbound one, and had an exit at the north end of the Rockaway Park bound platform which has been removed. Outside of fare control, there are stairs to either eastern corner of Rockaway Freeway and Beach 99th Street.

References

External links 

 
 Station Reporter — Rockaway Park Shuttle
 Steeplechase Station (Arrt's Arrchives)
 The Subway Nut — Beach 98th Street – Playland Pictures 
 Beach 98th Street entrance from Google Maps Street View
 Platform level from Google Maps Street View
 Mezzanine from Google Maps Street View

IND Rockaway Line stations
Rockaway, Queens
New York City Subway stations in Queens, New York
Railway stations in the United States opened in 1956
1956 establishments in New York City